is a Japanese manga created by Fujiko F. Fujio in 1985. It tells the story of two cute aliens that come to Earth to find the girl who will marry their prince of planet Mahl and find one in a sixth grade girl named Eri. It was subsequently adapted into an anime television series.

Characters 
 Chimpui , a mouse-like alien, who tells about the prince's marriage to a girl named Eri. Sometimes he tries to convince Eri to marry the prince and helps Eri on Earth or while on Mahl. He is voiced by Junko Hori
 Eri Kasuga , Eri is a 12-year-old Chinese-Japanese (via her ancestor, Kukuru from Doraemon: Nobita and the Birth of Japan) 6th grader who is a tomboy and also Chimpui's best friend. She is a healthy person. Her female friends are Sayaka Hata and Hotaru Fujino, and she is voiced by Megumi Hayashibara.
 Wanderyu , a dog-like alien, who is Chimpui's pal. He also helps Eri, but sometimes she hates him. Eri calls him "Grandpa Wada". He is voiced by Jōji Yanami.
 Shou Uchiki , Shou is a sixth grader who is good at studies but is weak at sports. He is Eri's very best friend who a crush on him. He dreams of becoming an astronaut one day. He is voiced by Sasaki Nozomu.
 Sunemi Koganeyama , she is Eri's rich friend with a fox-like face.
 Masao Oeyama , He is a strong 6th grader who is good at sports and he bullies Shou. He is voiced by Daiki Nakamura.
 Shosei Kitsune , A 6th grader who is absolutely short for his age and is Masao's sidekick. He is voiced by Jun'ichi Kanemaru.
 Prince Lulealv, his face is never shown in the manga or anime. Chimpui tells Eri that he is the most charming person on planet Mahl. It is also told that it is Eri's fate to marry him. He only appears in Eri's dreams (nightmares).

Media

Anime 

The series was first broadcast by TV Asahi from November 2, 1989, to April 18, 1991, and was broadcast across Asia in English via Disney Channel Asia. The anime is available on Amazon Video in India in Hindi.

References

External links
 Chimpui at Shin-Ei Animation
 Chimpui at TV Asahi
 DVD-BOX special site

1985 manga
1991 Japanese television series endings
Japanese children's animated comic science fiction television series
Anime series based on manga
Animated television series about children
Animated television series about dogs
Extraterrestrials in anime and manga
Animated television series about mice and rats
Fujiko F Fujio
Shin-Ei Animation
TV Asahi original programming
Slice of life anime and manga
Science fiction anime and manga